is a Japanese footballer currently playing as a midfielder for Albirex Niigata (S).

Club

Gainare Tottori

In 2021, he was loaned to J2 club, Gainare Tottori.

Tokyo Musashino United

In 2022, he was loaned to Tokyo Musashino United.

Career statistics

Club
.

Notes

International Statistics

U18 International caps

U15 International caps

References

2002 births
Living people
People from Odawara
Association football people from Kanagawa Prefecture
Japanese footballers
Japan youth international footballers
Association football midfielders
J3 League players
Shonan Bellmare players
Gainare Tottori players
Tokyo Musashino United FC players
Albirex Niigata Singapore FC players
Japanese expatriate footballers
Japanese expatriate sportspeople in Singapore
Expatriate footballers in Singapore